was a Japanese marathon runner and one of the early leaders of track and field athletics in Japan. He has been celebrated as the "father of marathon" in Japan.

Biography
Kanakuri was a native of Tamana, Kumamoto, Japan and attended the Tokyo Higher Normal School. During the November 1911 domestic qualifying trials for the 1912 Stockholm Olympics, although the length of the course was probably only , Kanakuri was reported to have set a marathon world record at 2 hours, 30 minutes and 33 seconds. He was thus selected as one of the only two athletes that Japan could afford to send to the event, as both athletes had to pay their own travel expenses of 1,800 yen. Therefore Kanakuri's fellow college students conducted a nationwide fundraiser, which resulted in collecting 1,500 yen in donations, while Sanetsugu Kanakuri, Shizo's oldest brother, had collected 300 yen, both on his behalf.

However, Kanakuri is best known for disappearing during the marathon race in the 1912 Stockholm Olympics. Kanakuri had a rough 18-day-long trip to Stockholm, first by ship and then by train all through the Trans-Siberian Railway, and needed five days to recover for the race. The race was held in Sollentuna Municipality, in Sweden, in – for this time – unexpected 25 °C (77 °F) heat, and over half of the runners in the event had hyperthermia. Kanakuri was weakened by the long journey from Japan and had problems with the white nights that he was experiencing for the first time and the local foods. To make things worse, the Japanese team coach, Hyozo Omori, had been mostly bedridden due to tuberculosis during his stay in Stockholm, resulting in the insufficient amount of pre-race training given to two athletes including Kanakuri. Kanakuri pulled out midway through the race and was cared for by a local family. Embarrassed from his "failure", he silently returned to Japan without notifying race officials.

Although local newspapers at the time correctly reported that Kanakuri withdrew halfway through the race, the fact that Kanakuri had not officially reported back after doing so gave birth to humorous stories in Sweden about the supposedly lost Japanese runner.

In 1967, he was contacted by Swedish Television and offered the opportunity to complete his run. He accepted and completed the marathon, remarking,"Kanaguri of Japan is now in the goal. Time, 54 years and 8 months 6 days 5 hours 32 minutes 20 seconds 3, which will end the entire schedule of the 5th Stockholm Olympic Games," was announced. He commented "It was a long trip. Along the way, I got married, had six children and 10 grandchildren."

Despite this setback, Kanakuri was selected to participate in the 1916 Summer Olympics, which were subsequently cancelled due to World War I. However, Kanakuri did compete in the 1920 Summer Olympics held in Antwerp, Belgium, where he finished the marathon race in 2 hours, 48 minutes and 45.4 seconds and placed 16th. Kanakuri subsequently participated in the 1924 Summer Olympics, where he failed to finish the race. Kanakuri is also known for his role in establishing the Hakone Ekiden relay marathon in 1920, aiming to train as many runners as 100 of those, so that they can achieve the Trans-American marathon relay. From 2004, the top prize in this race was named in his honor.

He died at the age of 92 on November 13, 1983 at his hometown of Tamana in Kumamoto Prefecture, Japan.

See also
Japan at the 1912 Summer Olympics
Idaten, a 2019 taiga drama where Kanakuri is played by Nakamura Kankurō VI

Notes

References

External links

Sports Illustrated. April 3, 1967

1891 births
1984 deaths
Sportspeople from Kumamoto Prefecture
Japanese male long-distance runners
Japanese male marathon runners
Olympic male marathon runners
Olympic athletes of Japan
Athletes (track and field) at the 1912 Summer Olympics
Athletes (track and field) at the 1920 Summer Olympics
Athletes (track and field) at the 1924 Summer Olympics
Japan Championships in Athletics winners
University of Tsukuba alumni
People from Tamana, Kumamoto
19th-century Japanese people
20th-century Japanese people